Muscal Mvuezolo-Musumbu (born 30 March 1979 in Kinshasa) is a Congolese-Belgian football player who last played for RRC Waterloo in Belgium.

International 
He made his first cap for Congo DR national football team against Gabon on 25 March 2008.

References

External links
 
 Profile on Football Line-ups
 Profile on UPC Live
 
 

1983 births
Living people
Democratic Republic of the Congo footballers
Democratic Republic of the Congo expatriate footballers
Democratic Republic of the Congo international footballers
Belgian footballers
K.V. Mechelen players
Royale Union Saint-Gilloise players
R.S.C. Anderlecht players
A.F.C. Tubize players
Kalamata F.C. players
Egaleo F.C. players
A.P.O. Akratitos Ano Liosia players
Ilisiakos F.C. players
Liga II players
FC Politehnica Iași (2010) players
Association football midfielders
Expatriate footballers in Belgium
Expatriate footballers in Greece
Expatriate footballers in Romania
Expatriate footballers in Turkey
Democratic Republic of the Congo expatriate sportspeople in Belgium
Democratic Republic of the Congo expatriate sportspeople in Greece
Democratic Republic of the Congo expatriate sportspeople in Romania
Democratic Republic of the Congo expatriate sportspeople in Turkey